Alexander Tolmachev (born 7 April 1993, Lukhovitsy) is a Russian political figure and a deputy of the 8th State Dumas.

From 2014 to 2015,  Tolmachev worked as director of the Youth center "Unimaks". In 2016, he was elected Deputy of the Council of Deputies of the Lukhovitsky District of the Moscow Oblast. The same year, he became an assistant to the deputy of the Moscow Oblast Duma Evgeny Aksakov, as well as an assistant to the deputy of the State Duma Yelena Serova. From February 2018 to February 2019, Tolmachev was the Deputy Head of the Moscow Regional Branch of the All-Russian Public Organization Young Guard of United Russia. On July 10, 2019, he was appointed Head of the Moscow Oblast Branch of the Young Guard of United Russia. Since September 2021, he has served as deputy of the 8th State Duma. He co-authored the draft law on compulsory insurance of volunteer lives and health.
In April 2022, Tolmachev was sanctioned by United States.

References

1993 births
Living people
United Russia politicians
21st-century Russian politicians
Eighth convocation members of the State Duma (Russian Federation)
People from Lukhovitsky District
Russian individuals subject to the U.S. Department of the Treasury sanctions